Kate Fox is a British social anthropologist, co-director of the Social Issues Research Centre (SIRC) and a Fellow of the Institute for Cultural Research. She has written several books, including Watching the English: The Hidden Rules of English Behaviour.

Biography
Kate Fox is the daughter of anthropologist Robin Fox.  As a child she lived in the UK, the United States, France, and Ireland. She studied for an undergraduate degree in anthropology and philosophy at Trinity Hall, Cambridge. In 1989 she became co-director of MCM Research Ltd., and continues to provide consulting services. She is now a co-director of the Social Issues Research Centre, based in Oxford, England.

Recent topics include social effects of alcohol and the purposes of small talk. Fox is currently writing a book that "examine[s] many aspects of 21st-century life and obsessions - including mobile phones, social media, online dating, shopping, celebrity, reality TV, computer games, selfies, etc - from an evolutionary/anthropological perspective".

In 2004, Fox married the neurosurgeon and acclaimed author Henry Marsh, having been previously married to Peter Kibby (during which time she was credited as Kate Fox Kibby).

Publications
Fox has written a number of books, including:

 In this book, Fox does an anthropological analysis by conducting experiments and uses participant observation to discover the unwritten rules that make an English person English. She tries to explain the cultural norms of the English, which are seen as peculiar by people who aren't English.

References

External links
 
  Criticism of Fox's work, particularly her book, Watching the English.
 Kate Fox's biography at the SIRC web site

Year of birth missing (living people)
Living people
20th-century English writers
21st-century English writers
20th-century English women writers
21st-century English women writers
Alumni of Trinity Hall, Cambridge
Cultural anthropologists
People associated with The Institute for Cultural Research
British women anthropologists